Ann Hamilton may refer to:

Ann Hamilton (artist) (born 1956), American artist
Ann Hamilton (British actress), known for her appearances on the Morecambe & Wise Show
Ann Lewis Hamilton, American television writer
Ann Mary Hamilton, English gothic and romantic novelist

See also
Anne Hamilton (disambiguation)